WRCN-FM (103.9 MHz) is a radio station broadcasting a News/Talk radio format, licensed to Riverhead, New York and serving eastern Long Island. The station is owned by JVC Media LLC with studios located inside of Long Island MacArthur Airport in Ronkonkoma, New York and transmitter located in Manorville, New York.

History
The station first went on the air in 1962 as WAPC-FM. In 1967 the call letters were changed to WHRF-FM, and in 1972 to the current WRCN-FM. In 1978, WRCN changed  from a top 40 format to what was then known as album-oriented rock (now known as classic rock). Some of the air–staff that have worked at the station over the years include, Zena Black, Bob Buchmann, Marc Coppola, John Loscalzo, Tim Sheehan, Dee Snider, and Chaz & AJ.

On August 27, 2012, WRCN-FM shifted their format to mainstream rock, under the "Rock of Long Island" slogan.

On November 15, 2013, at 5pm, WRCN-FM's rock format came to an abrupt end as the station temporarily changed formats to Christmas music. The station, going by the temporary name of "Christmas 103.9" then flipped to Conservative News/Talk as "LI NewsRadio 103.9" on December 26, 2013.

Previous logos

References

External links 
 

RCN-FM
Radio stations established in 1962
Mass media in Suffolk County, New York